There are several distinct, although overlapping categories of fool as a stock character in creative works (literature, film, etc.) and folklore: simpleton fool, clever fool, and  serendipitous fool.

Silly fool

A silly, stupid, simpleton, luckless fool is a butt of numerous jokes and tales all over the world.

Sometimes the foolishness is ascribed to a whole place, as exemplified by the  Wise Men of Gotham. The localizing of fools is common to most countries, and there are many other reputed imbecile centres in England besides Gotham. Thus there are the people of Coggeshall, Essex, the "carles" of Austwick, Yorkshire, the "gowks" of Gordon, Berwickshire, and for many centuries the charge of folly has been made against silly Suffolk and Norfolk (Descriptio Norfolciensium about twelfth century, printed in Wright's Early Mysteries and other Latin Poems).

In Germany there are the "Schildbürger", from the fictitious town of "Schilda"; in the Netherlands, the people of Kampen; in Bohemia, the people of Kocourkov; and in Moravia the people of Šimperk. There are also the Swedish Täljetokar from Södertälje and Kälkborgare from Kälkestad, and the Danish tell tales of the foolish inhabitants of the Molboland. In Latin America, the people of Galicia are the butt of many jokes. In Spain, the people of Lepe, a town in Andalusia, follow a similar fate. Among the ancient Greeks, Boeotia was the home of fools; among the Thracians, Abdera; among the ancient Jews, Nazareth; among modern Jews, Chełm; among the ancient Asiatics, Phrygia.

Subcategories
In Jewish folklore, Schlemiel and Schlimazl are two popular subtypes of a fool. The following saying helps to tell them apart:  a schlemiel is a man who spills hot soup on a schlimazl: the first one is clueless, while the second one is luckless.

Numbskull/noodlehead stories are about well-meaning folks who take an advice too literally to their own grievance or who find the most complicated solution to the most simple problem. However, sometimes they may end with luck ("serendipitous fool"). These can vary from an  absent-minded professor (a stock character in itself) to Jack from Jack and the Beanstalk who exchanged a cow for a bean. In that, numbskull stories overlap with trickster stories, where a numbskull is often a "mark" (victim) for a trickster.

Wise and clever fools

Many tales are based on the idea that a simple nature of a fool is a guise of wisdom, or even the wisdom itself.

On the other hand, the mask of a fool may be used to utter wise but unpleasant truths. Some classify jesters into two categories: "natural fools" (people who lacked social awareness and could occasionally utter the truth simply being unaware of social conventions) and "licensed fools" (often picked to be jester for their physical handicap, and telling the truth was simply part of their "job description").

In addition to jesters, naturally stupid people gave rise to other categories of respected fools, such as holy fool, e.g., yurodivy in Russian tradition, avadhuta  in some Indian religions, and other manifestations of "crazy wisdom" in various cultures.

Serendipitous fool

In scenarios of this kind a simpleton, a laughing stock in the end wins big, usually a princess or a kingdom, or wealth, or all the above. Brothers Grimm have three tales of a lucky simpleton. The Queen Bee, The Three Languages and The Three Feathers. In these the fool gets help from animals. The luck of the Russian folk character Ivan the Fool comes from his simplicity.

Heroes, villains and fools

While some characters are archetypal fools, at the same time, the coordinates "hero/villain/fool may be seen as major measures of any character. Sometimes these traits mix or boundaries are blurred."

Archetypal foolish persons
Ivan the Fool of  Russian folklore
, Polish version of Ivan the Fool
Hloupý Honza, Czech

Archetypal foolish groups
Fools of Chelm
Wise men of Gotham
Molboers
Hölmöläiset

Racist and other discriminative joke series
Blonde jokes
Sardarji jokes
Polish jokes
East Frisian jokes

See also
Shakespearean fool
Feigned madness
Fool's literature
Foolishness for Christ
Idiot savant
Švejk, a merry simpleton who often outwits the better ones.

References

Further reading
Guru Paramartha, a simpleton guru devised by Italian missionary Constanzo Beschi (1680–1742) for Tamils

Stock characters

ru:Дурак